Antonio Guarnieri (Venice, Italy, 1 February 1880 — Milan, Italy, 25 November 1952) was an Italian conductor and cellist.

After playing cello in the Martucci string quartet he turned to conducting in 1904, being engaged by the Vienna Court Opera in 1912.

He succeeded Arturo Toscanini at La Scala in 1929 and stayed there until shortly before his death.  A highly regarded technician at the podium, he conducted many important world premières, Ottorino Respighi's Belfagor, for instance.

It was hearing Guarnieri's conducting of Claude Debussy's Nocturnes that caused Claudio Abbado to resolve to become a conductor.

References

Sources 

 Harold Rosenthal and John Warrack: The Concise Oxford Dictionary of Opera. OXFORD UNIVERSITY PRESS, 1979

Italian male conductors (music)
Music directors (opera)
Italian classical cellists
1883 births
1952 deaths
20th-century Italian conductors (music)
20th-century Italian male musicians
20th-century cellists